Nat Cohen (23 December 1905 – 10 February 1988) was a British film producer and executive. For over four decades he was one of the most significant figures in the British film industry, particularly in his capacity as head of Anglo-Amalgamated and EMI Films; he helped finance the first Carry On movies and early work of filmmakers such as Ken Loach, John Schlesinger, Alan Parker and David Puttnam. In the early 1970s while head of EMI Films he was called the most powerful man in the British film industry.

Early life
Cohen was the son of a kosher butcher from the east end of London who was president of the Jubilee Street synagogue. He was the only son with one elder sister. Cohen's parents had emigrated from Poland in the early 1900s and his father was a silent partner in a cinema in the east end. Cohen attended a local LCV school and then joined his father's business.

Cinema owner
In 1932, Cohen bought a 650-seat cinema, the Savoy, in Teddington. Over three years he built up a circuit of three cinemas in London and four in the regions. One of the cinemas was the Mile End Empire, where Cohen ran talent quests before the movies commenced; among the artists who featured were a young Tommy Trinder and Bernard Delfont.

Cohen then turned to distribution, starting with re-releases of the Hal Roach comedies.

During World War II, Cohen distributed and exhibited military instruction films in England. His wife and daughter were sent to stay with his friend Sam Goldwyn.

Anglo Amalgamated
With Stuart Levy he co-founded Cohen and Levy Films in 1945 which eventually became Anglo-Amalgamated. His first film was an £800 documentary called Horse and Country.

Cohen produced some films with Dan Angel that were directed by Val Guest, Mystery at the Burlesque (1949) and Miss Pilgrim's Progress (1949).

Early features
Anglo-Amalgamated began to produce half hour featurettes at a cost of £10,000 then moved into features. Their early films included Ghost Ship (1952), Crow Hollow (1952), and Wide Boy (1952). They started to make films with American stars such as Street of Shadows (1953) which had Cesar Romero. They also had success with comedies such as Glad Tidings (1953).

Cohen's first film of note was The Sleeping Tiger (1954), starring Alexis Smith and Dirk Bogarde, and directed by Joseph Losey, an American expatriate making the first of many movies in Britain. Cat Girl (1957) began relationship between Anglo-Amalgamated and American International Pictures. The relationship with AIP resulted in Horrors of the Black Museum (1959), Circus of Horrors (1960), and Konga (1961).

Box-office success
Cohen had a big box office success with The Tommy Steele Story (1957), one of the most popular movies of the year in Britain. They followed it with The Duke Wore Jeans (1958).

Even more popular was Carry On Sergeant (1958), a huge box office success in Britain and very profitable due to its low cost. It led to a series of films: Carry On Nurse (1959) was even more popular,

For the company, he produced Peeping Tom and The Criminal (both 1960), the former, now highly regarded, was badly received at the time of its release. He greenlit some of the most important British films of the 1960s, including early feature films directed by John Schlesinger, John Boorman, and Ken Loach.

In 1962 Associated British Picture Corporation bought 50% of Anglo Amalgamated. Cohen became a director of them in 1969.

EMI Films
Anglo Amalgamated were majority owned by ABPC, who were taken over by EMI Films. Cohen joined the board of EMI and was put in charge of his own independent unit, Anglo-EMI.

The actual head of EMI at the time was Bryan Forbes but Cohen had autonomy over his own unit. EMI were going to spend $36 million on 28 films, 13 of which would be from Cohen's Anglo-Amalgamated unit with a budget of £7 million. Cohen:
Right from the start of Bryan Forbes joining the company, there was a sharp distinction between his films and mine. If Bryan had a cocktail party to announce his programme, then I had a cocktail party a few weeks later for mine, too. I had all I needed to keep me at full strength.|"We now have a great opportunity for British productions by British people", said Cohen.

Among the films Cohen made for Anglo-EMI included Get Carter, Percy, and several big screen adaptations of popular TV series. On the whole Cohen's movies for EMI outperformed those of Bryan Forbes financially. They were less well received critically, although Cohen's unit was the one that initiated the highly acclaimed The Go-Between (1971).

The most powerful man in the British film industry
Following the resignation of Forbes, Cohen became overall head of production for EMI. In April 1971 Cohen was appointed managing director of EMI-MGM, a new company formed to make international films. He was also put in charge of Anglo-EMI Film Distributors, Anglo-EMI Films, and Anglo Southern Film Music Publishing.

By 1973, the British film industry was in crisis, due to a combination of declining audiences, a weak dollar and lack of overseas investment. Anglo-EMI was the biggest studio operating in the country and was dubbed "Britain's one man film industry." Cohen was described as:
The most powerful man in the British film industry and almost the final arbiter of film taste in this country. No single man in Hollywood at its zenith held as much power. Nat Cohen not only finances productions but also distributes and exhibits. One American producer cracked that that he wouldn't be surprised if Cohen didn't also own the popcorn concessions.
That year Cohen estimated he was involved in 70% of films made in Britain that year; other figures put this at 50%. He also claimed that 95% of the films he had been involved with had made money. "It's bad for the film industry that I'm the only man making films", he said. "Because of this I don't really enjoy my power. I need competition and it's important there's competition if the industry is to survive."

Cohen however was bullish about the British industry's chances.
I can tell you there are still wonderful opportunities in the film industry, good and wonderful opportunities... a good film is doing better than ever before. A lot of people who complain about the industry don't have their feet on the ground. Look at their track records. They're not very good. The industry still has life. There's gold in them thar hills I tell you.
During this time Cohen commissioned two short films from director Alan Parker who later wrote of Cohen:
Nat Cohen was an avuncular, vulgar man with a shifty, pencil thin moustache who looked more like a Soho strip club spiv than a film mogul. His lowbrow taste in film production had secured him a sizeable wallet and hence his puffed–up position running EMI. No one could remember any films he’d made except that they’d apparently made a ton of money —  one of his racehorses had even won the 1962 Grand National. He drove up and down Wardour Street in a cream Rolls-Royce with a number plate that said Nat 1 (just to rub it in the noses of all of us snobby and opinionated film industry oiks who were less than enamored by him) to emphasize just who actually was the smart one.
Cohen financed key films in the career of David Puttnam, That'll be the Day and Stardust. Puttnam said Cohen would "work out what his downside risk was, the most he would lose, so consequently he would never turn down a project that was remotely interesting." He said Cohen would routinely offer to pay part of the budget, meaning producers had to get the rest.

Puttnam's then-producing partner Sandy Lieberson later said, "He gave us a blank cheque in effect, but always kept the reins on. The man had a real flair for movies and was such an underrated figure in the British film industry in the sixties and seventies, probably the most underrated. He made a tremendous contribution... He backed people. If he liked you, he'd back you. He hated failure, that was one thing he couldn't stand to be associated with."
 
Cohen's best known and most successful film from this period was Murder On the Orient Express (1974), which Cohen said was his idea. This enabled Cohen to fund a slate of six new films worth £6 million: Evil Under the Sun (later made in 1982), Aces High, Seven Nights in Japan, and Spanish Fly, plus two adaptations of TV shows, The Likely Lads and The Sweeney . Eventually To the Devil, a Daughter was made instead of Evil Under the Sun (which was filmed in 1982).

EMI Changes Management
In 1976, EMI bought out British Lion and their management wound up running EMI. Michael Deeley and Barry Spikings became managing directors of EMI Films while Cohen became executive chairman. He retired from this position at the end of 1977 to become a consultant.

Cohen stayed at EMI for several more years, a period he described as "an awkward stage... not quite sure where I was supposed to be; and rarely finding people available when I wanted to consult them. A delicate situation." During this time, EMI made some expensive failures including Honky Tonk Freeway and Can't Stop the Music, none of which involved Cohen. "I suppose you could sum it up this way", he said later, "I was very fortunate that as these costly deals were being made, I seemed to be losing control of picture making in the company." Michael Deeley, however, claimed that Cohen committed $1 million of EMI's money for the flop Roar. Deeley said Cohen was "quite a different" type of executive to him and Spikings. "His style was defined by great lies", according to Deeley.

Racehorse owner
With the success of his film company, Cohen was able to become a racehorse owner. His blue colours with white diamond, hooped sleeves and amber cap were carried to victory by Kilmore in the 1962 Grand National.

Personal life
Cohen died in hospital in February 1988 after suffering a heart attack. He was predeceased by a wife and a daughter who both died of cancer; he was survived by another daughter.

Appraisal
In 1974 a profile of Cohen described him as:
A more urbane version of the one-man-bands who used to boss the studios in Hollywood's heyday of the movie moguls. An impresario, a bon vivant, a racehorse owner with many winds in his stable, he applies the lessons of the turf to the film industry when he affirms that 'there is no such thing as playing safe' and describes himself as 'a gambler, but an extremely cautious one. Never reckless. I gamble when the odds are in my favour, not simply on hunches. I back judgement, not luck. But, ultimately, gamble I've got to... when the proposition has merit, I put it into effect without delay. I made the decision on a combination of the project and the individual who brings it to me.' Another 1971 article called him "a natty, cool, watchful man he does not admit to, and has never admitted to a crisis in the British film industry."

Cohen said of himself:
Making films is no different from the manufacture of shoes or any other product... My job is to entertain the public and if I can commercialism and art, all the better. But I have to remember they have other means of entertainment and a limited amount of money... Films are a pure gamble and I always try to bet with the odds in my favour. It's not so much the film one gambles on as the people making it.

Filmography
 
Murder at the Windmill (1949) – producer
Shooting Stars (1950) (documentary) – producer
Miss Pilgrim's Progress (1950) – producer
Ghost Ship (1952) – executive producer
Sport and Speed (1952) (documentary) – producer
Crow Hollow (1952) – executive producer
Wide Boy (1952) – producer
The Dark Stairway (1953) – executive producer
Street of Shadows (1953) – executive producer
The Drayton Case (1953) – producer
Glad Tidings! (1953) – executive producer
Radio Cab Murder (1954) – executive producer
 Dangerous Voyage (1954) – executive producer
The Sleeping Tiger (1954) – executive producer
Escapement (1957) – executive producer
Cat Girl (1957) – executive producer
The Tommy Steele Story (1957) – executive producer
The 6.5 Special (1958) – executive producer
The Duke Wore Jeans (1958) – producer
Carry On Sergeant (1958) – executive producer
Female Fiends (1958) – executive producer
Carry On Nurse (1959) – executive producer
Horrors of the Black Museum (1959) – executive producer
Peeping Tom (1960) – executive producer
Circus of Horrors (1960) – executive producer
A Christmas Carol (1960) – executive producer
The Criminal (1960) aka The Concrete Jungle – executive producer
Konga (1961) – executive producer
Payroll (1961) – executive producer
A Kind of Loving (1961) – executive producer
Dentist on the Job (1961) – executive producer
Carry On Cabby (1963) – executive producer
Billy Liar! (1963) – executive producer
Carry on Jack (1963) – executive producer
Nothing But the Best (1964) – executive producer
Carry on Spying (1964) – executive producer
The Masque of the Red Death (1964) – executive producer
Carry on Spying (1964) – executive producer
I've Gotta Horse (1964) – executive producer
Gonks Go Beat (1964) – executive producer
Three Hats for Lisa (1964) – executive producer
The Tomb of Ligeia (1965) – executive producer
City in the Sea (1965) – executive producer
Catch Us If You Can (1965) – executive producer
The Big Job (1965) – executive producer
Carry on Cleo (1965) – executive producer
Those Fantastic Flying Fools (1967) – executive producer
Poor Cow (1967) – executive producer
Shalako (1968) – executive producer
Lock Up Your Daughters (1969) – executive producer
The Year of Sir Ivor (1969) – executive producer
All Neat in Black Stockings (1969) – executive producer
The Body (1970) – executive producer
The Chastity Belt (1971) – executive producer
Up Pompeii (1971) – executive producer
Villain (1971) – executive producer
Up the Chastity Belt (1971) – executive producer
Family Life (1971) – executive producer
Percy (1971) – executive producer
City Beneath the Sea (1971) – executive producer
The Go-Between (1971) – executive producer
Fear in the Night (1972) – executive producer
A Time for Loving (1972) – executive producer
Straight on Till Morning (1972) – executive producer
Up the Front (1972) – executive producer
Demons of the Mind (1972) – executive producer
Our Miss Fred (1972) – executive producer
Made (1972) – executive producer
That'll Be the Day (1973) – executive producer
Our Cissy (1973) (short) – executive producer
Footsteps (1973) (short) – executive producer
Steptoe and Son (1973) – executive producer
Love Thy Neighbour (1973) – executive producer
Steptoe and Son Ride Again (1973) – executive producer
Holiday on the Buses (1973) – executive producer
The Final Programme (1973) – executive producer
The House in Nightmare Park (1973) – executive producer
Man at the Top (1973) – executive producer
Swallows and Amazons (1974) – executive producer
Take Me High (1974) – executive producer
It's Not the Size That Counts (1974) – executive producer
Stardust (1974) – executive producer
The Dove (1974) – executive producer
Murder on the Orient Express (1974) – executive producer
All Creatures Great and Small (1975) – executive producer
Alfie Darling (1975) – executive producer
A Boy and His Dog (1975) – executive producer
Spanish Fly (1976) – executive producer
Aces High (1976) – executive producer
Seven Nights in Japan (1976) – executive producer
It Shouldn't Happen to a Vet (1976) – executive producer
The Likely Lads (1976) – executive producer
Are You Being Served? (1977) – executive producer
Sweeney! (1977) – executive producer
Death on the Nile (1978) – executive producer
Clockwise (1986) – executive producer

References

Walker, Alexander, Hollywood England Stein and Day, 1974
Walker, Alexander, National Heroes, Harrap, 1985

External links
 
Nat Cohen at BFI
Obituary at Los Angeles Times
Obituary at New York Times

1905 births
1988 deaths
British film producers
British Jews
British racehorse owners and breeders